The Renard Islands are an archipelago in the Solomon Sea . Politically they belong to Milne Bay Province in the southeastern region of Papua New Guinea.

History
The islands were encountered by the French explorer Antoine Bruni d'Entrecasteaux on 13 June 1793 and he named them îles Renard.

American artillery batteries were placed on the islands during World War II.

Geography
The Renard Islands are located in the north of Louisiade archipelago, 21 km north of the barrier reef of Vanatinai and 19 km southeast of Misima. 
The small Manuga Reef, which is located 19 km southeast of Renard Islands, is part of the Renard Ward.
The Renard Islands are located on a 21-km by 6 km wide sandbank in a rectangular shape. The largest islands in the group are Kimuta (286 ha ), Niva Beno (49 ha) and Oreia (47 ha). Kimuta Island is 5.9 kilometers long, with widths averaging at 550 meters. The hilly island rises up to 84 meters above the sea level. The islands of Niva Beno and Topuna are lying east of Kimuta. Bagaium is a tiny island (less than one hectare) about 2 kilometers southwest of Kimuta. On the northwest side of the bank several reefs including the islands Baiwa (17 ha), Pana Wadai (1 ha) and Pana Roran (6 ha). On the southeast side of the sandbank are the islands of Oreia (5.5 km southeast of Kimuta) and Epoko (4 ha, 13 km southeast of Kimuta). Both islands are located in the center of small reef lagoon.

Population
According to the 2014 census, the island group had 617 inhabitants, spread over two villages on the main island Kimuta:
Awa (345, in the east)
Atuatua (272 in the West)
Several sources claim that there is a family from Kimuta that actually lives yearly on the island of Niva Beno.

References

Archipelagoes of Papua New Guinea
Islands of Milne Bay Province
Louisiade Archipelago